Larisa Gennadyevna Lukyanenko (Russian: Лариса Геннадьевна Лукьяненко,  born 7 August 1973) is a former Belarusian individual rhythmic gymnast.

Career 
Loukianenko took up rhythmic gymnastics in 1980 at age 7. She was coached by Galina Krylenko at Club Dynamo in Minsk. She emerged as a top class competitor at the 1992 World Rhythmic Gymnastics Championships in Brussels, Belgium. A broken ankle prevented her from competing in the 1993 World Championships and it took her nearly a year to recover. She made a comeback at the 1994 European Championships. She swept the 1993 Grand Prix Final winning the All-around and the event finals in hoop, ball, clubs and ribbon.

Loukianenko's best apparatus was rope; she became a three-time times World Champion on this apparatus.

She participated at the 1996 Olympic Games, and ranked 5th in the AA semi-finals and 7th in the AA finals. She retired at age 23 in 1996.

Loukianenko is currently a coach and judge for the Belarusian Gymnastics Federation. She and her former teammate, Tatiana Ogrizko, are currently coaching Melitina Staniouta.

References

External links

http://www.gymnasticsresults.com/o1996rh.html
http://larissarsg.tripod.com/

1973 births
Living people
Belarusian rhythmic gymnasts
Olympic gymnasts of Belarus
Gymnasts at the 1996 Summer Olympics
Sportspeople from Krasnoyarsk
Medalists at the Rhythmic Gymnastics World Championships
Medalists at the Rhythmic Gymnastics European Championships